The year 1989 in science and technology involved many significant events, some listed below.

Astronomy
 August – Asteroid 4769 Castalia is the first asteroid directly imaged, by radar from Arecibo.
 August 25 – The Voyager 2 spacecraft makes its closest approach to Neptune, providing definitive proof of the planet's rings.
 September 5 – Pluto–Charon barycentre comes to perihelion.
Asteroid 5128 Wakabayashi is discovered by Masahiro Koishikawa.
4292 Aoba is discovered.
4871 Riverside is discovered.
6089 Izumi is discovered.
6190 Rennes is discovered
8084 Dallas is discovered.

Biology
 Discovery of the cystic fibrosis trans-membrane conductance regulator gene.
 The New Zealand Department of Conservation begins to implement a Kakapo Recovery Plan.

Computer science
 March 12 - Tim Berners-Lee submits a memorandum, titled "Information Management: A Proposal", to the management at CERN for a system that would eventually become the World Wide Web.
 June 8 – GNU Bash is released.
 July 26 – A federal grand jury indicts Cornell University student Robert Tappan Morris, Jr. for releasing a computer virus, making him the first person to be prosecuted under the 1986 Computer Fraud and Abuse Act in the United States.

Environment
 The global concentration of carbon dioxide in Earth's atmosphere reaches 350 ppm (parts per million) by volume.

Physics
 January – Supplee's paradox is published.
 March 23 – Stanley Pons and Martin Fleischmann announce cold fusion at the University of Utah.

Physiology and medicine
 The Oxford Database of Perinatal Trials begins publishing online.
 The hepatitis C virus (HCV) is first identified by Michael Houghton and his team.

Technology
 July 17 – The Northrop Grumman B-2 Spirit "Stealth Bomber" aircraft, developed for the United States Air Force, first flies.
 Isamu Akasaki produces the first Gallium nitride p-n junction blue/UV light-emitting diode.

Awards
 Nobel Prizes
 Physics – Norman F. Ramsey, Hans G. Dehmelt, Wolfgang Paul
 Chemistry – Sidney Altman, Thomas R. Cech
 Medicine – J. Michael Bishop, Harold E. Varmus
 Turing Award –  William (Velvel) Kahan

Births
 May 9 – Katie Bouman, American computer imaging scientist

Deaths
 February 27 – Konrad Lorenz (born 1903), Austrian zoologist.
 March 18 – Sir Harold Jeffreys (born 1891), English mathematician.
 April 24 – Horace Hodes (born 1907), American medical researcher.
 August 10 – Isabella Forshall (born 1900), English pediatric surgeon.
 August 12 – William Shockley (born 1910), American physicist.
 August 20 – George Adamson (born 1906), British wildlife conservationist.
 August 29 – Sir Peter Scott (born 1909), English wildlife conservationist.
 October 11 – M. King Hubbert (born 1903), American geophysicist.
 October 28 – Louise Hay (born 1935), French-born American mathematician; breast cancer.
 December 14 – Andrei Sakharov (born 1921), Soviet Russian nuclear physicist and political dissident.

References

 
20th century in science
1980s in science